Luiza Erundina de Sousa (November 30, 1934) is a Brazilian politician, born in Uiraúna, a small city in the interior of the Brazilian state of Paraíba.

Political history 
From 1980 to 1997, she was affiliated with the PT party (Workers’ Party). In 1997, she changed to the PSB party. Due to disagreements within PSB that decided to support the impeachment process against president Dilma Rousseff, Erundina switched to party PSOL in March 2016.

Erundina served on the São Paulo city council from 1983 to 1987. From 1987 to 1988 she was a state deputy for the state of São Paulo. She was São Paulo's mayor from 1989 to 1992, and is currently a federal deputy from São Paulo. She was re-elected in 2002 and again in 2006, in 2010, in 2014 and in 2018.

In the 2020 São Paulo mayoral election, Erundina ran as the vice mayoral candidate of Guilherme Boulos, also of PSOL.

Education 
Erundina was born to a very poor family. Notwithstanding the obstacles, she managed to pursue a Bachelor's degree in Social Service from Federal University of Paraíba. She also holds a Master's degree in Sociology from University of São Paulo.

References

External links 
 Information in Portuguese from the Brazilian congress

|-

|-

|-

|-

|-

1934 births
Brazilian Socialist Party politicians
Living people
Mayors of São Paulo
Members of the Chamber of Deputies (Brazil) from São Paulo
Members of the Legislative Assembly of São Paulo
Women mayors of places in Brazil
Workers' Party (Brazil) politicians
Socialism and Liberty Party politicians
Catholic feminists
Brazilian feminists